The British School, Caracas (TBSC) is a private school in Altamira, Caracas, Venezuela that provides a British style education based upon the framework of the National Curriculum for England, with focus on Venezuelan culture and history. It also offers the International Baccalaureate Diploma Programme.

See also
Education in Venezuela

References

External links

Private schools in Venezuela
Educational institutions established in 1950
International schools in Caracas
1950 establishments in Venezuela